The 1980–81 season was Nottingham Forest's 116th year in existence and fourth consecutive season in the First Division.

Summary
In May, the board appointed Geoffrey McPherson as the club's new chairman, replacing Stuart Dryden. On 30 May McPherson negotiated a new three-year new contract for Clough and Taylor after they won the European Cup Final. The club reinforced the squad, with forward Ian Wallace signing from Coventry City for £1.25 million  and Swiss player Raimondo Ponte signing from Grasshopper Club Zürich, to boost an ageing midfield. On 15 October, the club sold Garry Birtles to Manchester United for £1.25 million, prompting the arrival of forward Peter Ward from Brighton & Hove Albion. In spite of these new arrivals, during the season the team dropped to mid-table, and by spring the midfield was weakened after the departures of Martin O'Neill, Raimondo Ponte, Ian Bowyer and defender Larry Lloyd. Forward Trevor Francis suffered an injury that sidelined him until December. Forest finished the season in 7th place, missing out on qualification for the following season's UEFA Cup after a draw 1–1 with Coventry City on the final day, with Southampton taking the European berth on goal difference.

Forest's defence of the European Cup ended in the first round following a 2–0 aggregate defeat to Bulgarian side CSKA Sofia. In the League Cup the team was eliminated in the fourth round by Watford. The club lost the European Super Cup on away goals to Valencia CF. In February, the team lost the Intercontinental Cup 1–0 to Nacional in Tokyo. Finally, in the FA Cup the team was knocked out at the quarter final stage following a replay with Ipswich Town.

Squad

Transfers

Competitions
A list of Nottingham Forest's matches in the 1980–81 season.

First Division

League table

Results by round

Matches

League Cup

Second round

Third round

Fourth round

FA Cup

Third round

Fourth round

Fifth round

Quarterfinals

European Cup

Round of 32

European Super Cup

Intercontinental Cup

Statistics

Players statistics

Notes

References

Nottingham Forest F.C. seasons
Nottingham Forest F.C.